My Heart Sings is an album by American singer Tony Bennett. It was recorded in 1961 and released the same year on Columbia as CL 1658. So far, it has been released on CD only in Japan by Sony/CBS.

Track listing
"Don't Worry 'Bout Me" (Rube Bloom, Ted Koehler) - 3:00
"Dancing in the Dark" (Arthur Schwartz, Howard Dietz) - 2:32
"I'm Coming Virginia" (Will Cook, Donald Heywood) - 2:58
"(All of a Sudden) My Heart Sings" (Harold Rome, Jean Marie Blanvillain, Henry Herpin) - 3:16
"It Never Was You" (Kurt Weill, Maxwell Anderson) - 3:04
"You Took Advantage of Me" (Richard Rodgers, Lorenz Hart) - 2:25
"Close Your Eyes" (Bernice Petkere) - 2:20
"Stella by Starlight" (Ned Washington, Victor Young) - 2:26
"More Than You Know" (Billy Rose, Vincent Youmans, Edward Eliscu) - 3:40
"My Ship" (Ira Gershwin, Weill)- 3:10
"Lover Man" (Roger Ramirez, Jimmy Davis, Jimmy Sherman) - 3:35
"Toot, Toot, Tootsie! (Goodbye)" (Ted Fiorito, Ernie Erdman, Dan Russo, Gus Kahn) - 1:54

Recorded on April 4 (#1, 3-4, 6, 9, 11), April 5 (#7, 12) and April 6 (#2, 5, 8, 10), 1961.

Personnel
Tony Bennett – vocals
Ralph Burns - conductor, arranger
Bernie Leighton - piano
Danny Bank, Al Klink, Ed Caine (#2, 5, 8, 10), Toots Mondello, Zoot Sims (#7, 12), Romeo Penque, Jerry Sanfino (#1, 3–4, 6–7, 9, 11–12) - saxophones
Bernie Glow, Irving Markowitz, Jimmy Maxwell, Carl 'Doc' Severinsen - trumpets
Robert Alexander, Urbie Green, Wayne Andre (#7, 12), William Elton (#7, 12), Dick Hixson, Frank Rehak - trombone
Barry Galbraith, Chuck Wayne, Mundell Lowe (#7, 12) - guitar
Milt Hinton - bass
Eddie Costa - vibes (#2, 5, 8, 10)
Herb Lovelle - drums

References

1961 albums
Tony Bennett albums
Albums conducted by Ralph Burns
Albums arranged by Ralph Burns
Columbia Records albums